McDull: Rise of the Rice Cooker (麥兜·飯寶奇兵) is a 2016 Chinese-Hong Kong animated comedy film directed by Brian Tse and featuring the Hong Kong character McDull. It was released in China on September 15, 2016.

plot 
Mcdull develops an interest on inventing. Suddenly, a monster attacked Earth. Then, there was a competition of inventing a robot that could defeat the monster. Mcdull's robot, a rice cooker won and the principal created a giant machine to help him regonise its thoughts. However, it takes a hundred years to make it work. Mcdull's mother and her friends help to shorten the time a lot. Secretly, the one who got placed second on the competition upgraded his robot for his son with the scientist which was the principal's nemesis. Then, the monster came back and killed many robots  including the upgraded one. At last, the rice cooker fought the monster. It died but prevented the monster from killing Earth. Even though Mcdull failed, he was determined to invent more.

Voice cast 

 Zhang Zhengzhong as McDull
 Sandra Ng as Madame Mak
 Anthony Wong as School Principal
 The Pancakes as Miss Chan

Reception
The film has grossed  at the Chinese box office.

References

2016 animated films
2016 films
Chinese animated films
Hong Kong animated films
Animated comedy films
2016 comedy films
Hong Kong comedy films
McDull
Animated films based on comics
Cantonese-language films
2010s Hong Kong films